The Libyan Studies Center (Markaz dirasat jihad al-libiyin didda al-ghazw al-itali) is a cultural center opened in 1978 in Tripoli, Libya. It holds 100,000 volumes.

The General Authority of Islamic Affairs and Endowments set claim to the land occupied by the building in 2007.

See also 
 National Archives of Libya

References

Bibliography
 

Buildings and structures in Tripoli, Libya
Libyan culture
Libraries in Libya
1970s establishments in Libya
Organizations based in Tripoli, Libya